

2017–18 NCAA football bowl games
 December 16, 2017 – January 8, 2018: 2017–18 NCAA football bowl games

2017–18 College Football Playoff and Championship Game
 December 29, 2017: 2017 Cotton Bowl Classic in Arlington at AT&T Stadium
 The Ohio State Buckeyes defeated the USC Trojans, 24–7.
 December 30, 2017: 2017 Fiesta Bowl in Glendale at University of Phoenix Stadium
 The Penn State Nittany Lions defeated the Washington Huskies, 35–28.
 December 30, 2017: 2017 Orange Bowl in Miami Gardens at Hard Rock Stadium
 The Wisconsin Badgers defeated the Miami Hurricanes, 34–24.
 January 1: 2018 Peach Bowl in Atlanta at Mercedes-Benz Stadium
 The UCF Knights defeated the Auburn Tigers, 34–27.
 January 1: 2018 Rose Bowl in Pasadena at Rose Bowl
 The Georgia Bulldogs defeated the Oklahoma Sooners, 54–48.
 January 1: 2018 Sugar Bowl in New Orleans at Mercedes-Benz Superdome
 The Alabama Crimson Tide defeated the Clemson Tigers, 24–6.
 January 8: 2018 College Football Playoff National Championship in Atlanta at Mercedes-Benz Stadium
 The Alabama Crimson Tide defeated the Georgia Bulldogs, 26–23, to win the national championship.

2017–18 Non-CFP bowl games
 December 16, 2017: 2017 New Orleans Bowl in New Orleans at Mercedes-Benz Superdome
 The Troy Trojans defeated the North Texas Mean Green, 50–30.
 December 16, 2017: 2017 Cure Bowl in Orlando at Camping World Stadium
 The Georgia State Panthers defeated the Western Kentucky Hilltoppers, 27–17.
 December 16, 2017: 2017 Las Vegas Bowl in Las Vegas at Sam Boyd Stadium
 The Boise State Broncos defeated the Oregon Ducks, 38–28.
 December 16, 2017: 2017 New Mexico Bowl in Albuquerque at Dreamstyle Stadium
 The Marshall Thundering Herd defeated the Colorado State Rams, 31–28.
 December 16, 2017: 2017 Camellia Bowl in Montgomery at Cramton Bowl
 The Middle Tennessee Blue Raiders defeated the Arkansas State Red Wolves, 35–30.
 December 19, 2017: 2017 Boca Raton Bowl in Boca Raton at FAU Stadium
 The Florida Atlantic Owls defeated the Akron Zips, 50–3.
 December 20, 2017: 2017 Frisco Bowl in Frisco at Toyota Stadium
 The Louisiana Tech Bulldogs defeated the SMU Mustangs, 51–10.
 December 21, 2017: 2017 Gasparilla Bowl in St. Petersburg at Tropicana Field
 The Temple Owls defeated the FIU Panthers, 28–3.
 December 22, 2017: 2017 Bahamas Bowl in Nassau at Thomas Robinson Stadium
 The Ohio Bobcats defeated the UAB Blazers, 41–6.
 December 22, 2017: 2017 Famous Idaho Potato Bowl in Boise at Albertsons Stadium
 The Wyoming Cowboys defeated the Central Michigan Chippewas, 37–14.
 December 23, 2017: 2017 Birmingham Bowl in Birmingham at Legion Field
 The South Florida Bulls defeated the Texas Tech Red Raiders, 38–34.
 December 23, 2017: 2017 Armed Forces Bowl in Fort Worth at Amon G. Carter Stadium
 The Army Black Knights defeated the San Diego State Aztecs, 42–35.
 December 23, 2017: 2017 Dollar General Bowl in Mobile at Ladd–Peebles Stadium
 The Appalachian State Mountaineers defeated the Toledo Rockets, 34–0.
 December 24, 2017: 2017 Hawaii Bowl in Honolulu at Aloha Stadium
 The Fresno State Bulldogs defeated the Houston Cougars, 26–20.
 December 26, 2017: 2017 Cactus Bowl in Phoenix at Chase Field
 The Kansas State Wildcats defeated the UCLA Bruins, 35–17.
 December 26, 2017: 2017 Quick Lane Bowl in Detroit at Ford Field
 The Duke Blue Devils defeated the Northern Illinois Huskies, 36–14.
 December 26, 2017: 2017 Heart of Dallas Bowl in Dallas at Cotton Bowl
 The Utah Utes defeated the West Virginia Mountaineers, 30–14.
 December 27, 2017: 2017 Independence Bowl in Shreveport at Independence Stadium
 The Florida State Seminoles defeated the Southern Miss Golden Eagles, 42–13.
 December 27, 2017: 2017 Pinstripe Bowl in The Bronx (New York City) at Yankee Stadium
 The Iowa Hawkeyes defeated the Boston College Eagles, 27–20.
 December 27, 2017: 2017 Texas Bowl in Houston at NRG Stadium
 The Texas Longhorns defeated the Missouri Tigers, 33–16.
 December 27, 2017: 2017 Foster Farms Bowl in Santa Clara at Levi's Stadium
 The Purdue Boilermakers defeated the Arizona Wildcats, 38–35.
 December 28, 2017: 2017 Military Bowl in Annapolis at Navy–Marine Corps Memorial Stadium
 The Navy Midshipmen defeated the Virginia Cavaliers, 49–7.
 December 28, 2017: 2017 Camping World Bowl in Orlando at Camping World Stadium
 The Oklahoma State Cowboys defeated the Virginia Tech Hokies, 30–21.
 December 28, 2017: 2017 Alamo Bowl in San Antonio at Alamodome
 The TCU Horned Frogs defeated the Stanford Cardinal, 39–37.
 December 28, 2017: 2017 Holiday Bowl in San Diego at SDCCU Stadium
 The Michigan State Spartans defeated the Washington State Cougars, 42–17.
 December 29, 2017: 2017 Belk Bowl in Charlotte at Bank of America Stadium
 The Wake Forest Demon Deacons defeated the Texas A&M Aggies, 55–52.
 December 29, 2017: 2017 Sun Bowl in El Paso at Sun Bowl
 The NC State Wolfpack defeated the Arizona State Sun Devils, 52–31.
 December 29, 2017: 2017 Music City Bowl in Nashville at Nissan Stadium
 The Northwestern Wildcats defeated the Kentucky Wildcats, 24–23.
 December 29, 2017: 2017 Arizona Bowl in Tucson at Arizona Stadium
 The New Mexico State Aggies defeated the Utah State Aggies, 26–20.
 December 30, 2017: 2017 TaxSlayer Bowl in Jacksonville at EverBank Field
 The Mississippi State Bulldogs defeated the Louisville Cardinals, 31–27.
 December 30, 2017: 2017 Liberty Bowl in Memphis at Liberty Bowl Memorial Stadium
 The Iowa State Cyclones defeated the Memphis Tigers, 21–20.
 January 1, 2018: 2018 Outback Bowl in Tampa at Raymond James Stadium
 The South Carolina Gamecocks defeated the Michigan Wolverines, 26–19.
 January 1, 2018: 2018 Citrus Bowl in Orlando at Camping World Stadium
 The Notre Dame Fighting Irish defeated the LSU Tigers, 21–17.

National Football League
 January 28: 2018 Pro Bowl  in Orlando at Camping World Stadium
 The AFC defeated the NFC, 24–23.
 Offensive MVP: Delanie Walker (Tennessee Titans)
 Defensive MVP: Von Miller (Denver Broncos)
 February 4: Super Bowl LII in Minneapolis at U.S. Bank Stadium
 The Philadelphia Eagles defeated the New England Patriots, 41–33, to win their first Super Bowl title.
 April 26–28: 2018 NFL Draft in Arlington at AT&T Stadium
 #1 pick: Baker Mayfield (to the Cleveland Browns from the Oklahoma Sooners)
 September 6 – December 30: 2018 NFL season
 AFC Regular Season winners: Kansas City Chiefs
 NFC Regular Season winners: New Orleans Saints

International Federation of American Football and other American football events
 June 14 – 24: 2018 World University American Football Championship in Harbin
  defeated , 39–3, in the final.  took third place.
 July 14 – 23: 2018 Men's IFAF U-19 World Championship in Mexico City
  defeated , 13–7, to win their second consecutive and third overall Men's IFAF U-19 World Championship title.
  took third place.
 August 9 – 12: 2018 IFAF Flag Football World Championship in Panama City
 Men:  defeated , 19–13, to win their third consecutive and fourth overall Men's IFAF Flag Football World Championship title.
  took third place.
 Women:  defeated , 27–12, to win their first Women's IFAF Flag Football World Championship title.
  took third place.

IFAF Europe
 April 14 – June 10: 2018 BIG6 European Football League
 The New Yorker Lions defeated fellow German team, the Frankfurt Universe, 20–19, to win their fourth consecutive and sixth overall league championship at Eurobowl XXXII.
 July 28 – August 5: 2018 European Championship of American football in Vantaa
  defeated , 28–14, to win their first European Championship of American football title.
  took third place.

Other leagues
 January 25: Vince McMahon announces a relaunch of the XFL to begin play in winter 2020.
 March 20: Charlie Ebersol announces the launch of the Alliance of American Football to begin play in winter 2019.

References

External links
 National Football League
 International Federation of American Football

 
2018 sport-related lists